Vestlandsk or Vestlandske dialekter (West Norwegian) is a collective term for the dialects that are spoken on the coast of western Norway in the area ranging from Romsdal in the north to Agder in the south. These dialects can furthermore be split into north-western dialects

Nordvestlandske dialekter (North-Western dialects) have e-infinitive, and extends from the middle of Sogn og Fjordane to Romsdal. Of these, one can mention:
 Jølstramål – centering on Jølster
 Sunnmørsdialekt – collective term for dialects in Sunnmøre
 Romsdalsdialekt – dialect of Romsdal
Sørvestlandske dialekter (South-western dialects) have a-infinitive, and extends from the inner Sogn og Fjordane, through Hordaland and Rogaland and western part of Agder. Of these, one can mention:
 Bergensk, Haugesundsk, Stavangersk – these are city dialects (bymål). They have strong simplification, which is characteristic for all urban dialects (bydialekter), but originate from the dialects of the area with which they have much in common.
 Jærsk – dialect in Jæren
 Strilamål – dialect  of Strilelandet, an area around Bergen
 Sunnhordlandsdialekt – dialect of Sunnhordland
Sørlandske dialekter (Southern dialects) have -voicing, guttural R and a-endings, and is spoken in the eastern part of Agder and part of Telemark.

See also
Norwegian dialects

References

Other sources
Jahr, Ernst Håkon (1990) Den Store dialektboka (Oslo: Novus) 
Kristoffersen, Gjert (2000) The Phonology of Norwegian (Oxford University Press) 
Vanvik, Arne (1979) Norsk fonetikk (Oslo: Universitetet i Oslo) 

Norwegian language
Norwegian dialects